James McDonnell (born March 21, 1961), known by the stage name Slim Jim Phantom, is the drummer for Stray Cats. Alongside bandmates Brian Setzer and Lee Rocker, he spearheaded the neo-rockabilly movement of the early 1980s.

Phantom currently plays in the band Kat Men with Imelda May guitarist Darrel Higham and is the host of the weekly radio show "Rockabilly Rave-up" on the satellite radio station Underground Garage.

Biography
Born in Brooklyn and raised in Massapequa, New York, Phantom grew up listening to his parents' jazz records and began playing drums by the age of ten. He took lessons with Mousie Alexander, who played with Benny Goodman, studying jazz and working through books by Jim Chapin and Ted Reed.

 By the late 1970s, he was playing in bands with his childhood friend, bassist Lee Rocker. They soon joined forces with guitarist Brian Setzer to form Stray Cats. When performing with Stray Cats, Phantom did not sit behind a standard drum kit like most drummers, but instead opted to play in a standing position with a minimalist set-up of bass drum, snare drum, hi-hat, and crash cymbal.

During downtime from Stray Cats, Phantom played in swing, rockabilly, and jump blues combo The Swing Cats with Rocker and ex-Polecats guitarist Danny B. Harvey, as well as rockabilly and glam rock project Phantom, Rocker & Slick with Rocker and guitarist Earl Slick. Phantom also played with Jerry Lee Lewis.

He later formed Col. Parker with former Guns N' Roses guitarist Gilby Clarke, releasing the album Rock n Roll Music in 2001.

Most recently, he has been involved in the eponymous roots-rock band Slim Jim's Phantom Trio; rock-and-roll supergroup Dead Men Walking with Kirk Brandon and Mike Peters, and Captain Sensible; and rockabilly supergroup The Head Cat with Danny B. Harvey and the late Motörhead vocalist and bassist Lemmy. He also hosts the Rockabilly Raveup show on Little Steven's Underground Garage.

He was married to actress Britt Ekland from 1984 to 1992 and has a son, T.J. (born 1988), with her. , he is married to Jennie Vee, bassist for Eagles of Death Metal.

In 2021, he formed a rockabilly band with Jimmy Barnes and Chris Cheney. In March 2023, Barnes announced the supergroup The Barnestormers, featuring Barnes, Cheney, Phantom with Jools Holland and Kevin Shirley. A self-titled album is set for release on 26 May 2023.

Discography
Stray Cats – Stray Cats (1981)
Stray Cats – Gonna Ball (1981)
Stray Cats – Built for Speed (1982)
Stray Cats – Rant N' Rave with the Stray Cats (1983)
Phantom, Rocker & Slick – Phantom, Rocker & Slick (1985)
Phantom, Rocker & Slick – Cover Girl (1986)
Stray Cats – Rock Therapy (1986)
Stray Cats – Blast Off! (1989)
Stray Cats – Let's Go Faster! (1990)
Stray Cats – The Best of the Stray Cats: Rock This Town (1990)
Stray Cats – Choo Choo Hot Fish (1992)
Stray Cats – Original Cool (1993)
Swing Cats – Swing Cats (1999)
Swing Cats – A Special Tribute to Elvis (2000)
The Head Cat – Lemmy, Slim Jim & Danny B (2000)
Swing Cats – Swing Cat Stomp (2000)
Col Parker – Rock N Roll Music (2001)
Swing Cats – A Rock'A-Billy Christmas (2002)
13 Cats – In the Beginning (2002)
13 Cats – 13 Tracks (2003)
Dead Men Walking – Live at Leeds (2003)
Dead Men Walking – Live at Darwen (2004)
13 Cats – In the Beginning 2 (2004)
Stray Cats – Rumble in Brixton (2004)
Dead Men Walking – Live at CBGB's New York City (2005)
Dead Men Walking – Graveyard Smashes Volume 1 (2006)
The Head Cat – Fool's Paradise (2006)
Kat Men – Kat Men (2006)
The Head Cat – Walk the Walk...Talk the Talk (2011)
Kat Men – The Kat Men Cometh (2013)
Stray Cats – 40 (2019)

References

External links
 
 Slim Jim Phantom Interview NAMM Oral History Library (2019)

1961 births
Living people
Stray Cats members
American expatriates in the United Kingdom
American rock drummers
American rockabilly musicians
Musicians from Brooklyn
People from Massapequa, New York
20th-century American drummers
American male drummers
Dead Men Walking members
The Head Cat members